Founded in 1950 as the Anglo-Israel Chamber of Commerce, UK Israel Business encourages and supports bilateral trade and investment between the UK & Israel.  Previously known as the British-Israel Chamber of Commerce, the name UK Israel Business was adopted in 2011 through a merger between the former British-Israel Chamber of Commerce (B-ICC) and Israel Britain Business Council (IBBC).

Overview
The Chairman of UK Israel Business is Leon Blitz of Grovepoint Capital and the Chief Executive is Hugo Bieber. The organisation has a network of over 2000 companies and 10,000 business leaders. and works closely with the Department for International Trade, the British Embassy in Tel Aviv, the Israeli Embassy in London and the UK Israel Tech Hub.

A company limited by guarantee, UK Israel Business is a bilateral chamber of commerce. Their goal is to provide a meeting place and platform for business.

Events & Delegations 
UK Israel Business organises a wide variety of events and delegations in the UK and Israel including conferences, business breakfasts, private roundtable events and business delegations.

British Israeli Business Awards Dinner 
The organisation hosts the annual British Israeli Business Awards Dinner where companies contributing to trade and investment between the two countries are recognised.
British Israeli Business Awards Dinner 2018

The dinner was addressed by Dr. Erel N. Margalit, founder of Jerusalem Venture Partners and the following companies and individuals were recognised with awards at the dinner:
 British Company of the Year: London Stock Exchange Group
 Israeli Company of the Year: LABS
 Israeli Listed Company of the Year: Crossrider
 Most Promising Company of the Year: Healthy.io
 Lifetime Achievement Award: Leo Noé

British Israeli Business Awards Dinner 2017 
The dinner was addressed by Dan Doctoroff, CEO of SideWalk Labs and the following companies and individuals were recognised with awards at the dinner:
 British Company of the Year: Barclays
 Israel Company of the Year: Gett
 Most Promising Company of the Year: Hibob
 Lifetime Achievement Award: Daniel Dover of BDO

British Israeli Business Awards Dinner 2015 

The dinner was addressed by The Rt. Hon Sajid Javid, who gave his first speech as Business Secretary at the dinner. The following companies and individuals were recognised with awards at the dinner:
 British Company of the Year: easyJet
 Israeli Company of the Year: Orbotech
 Most Promising Company of the Year: Zeek
 Israeli Listed Company of the Year: XL Media plc
 Lifetime Achievement Award: Sir Harry Solomon

British Israeli Business Awards Dinner 2014 
The dinner was addressed by Israel's then leader of the opposition, Isaac Herzog MK.  The following companies and individuals were recognised with awards at the dinner:
 British Company of the Year: Arup 
 Israeli Company of the Year: Plus500
 Most Promising Company of the Year: eToro
 Lifetime Achievement Award: Lord Young of Graffham

British Israeli Business Awards Dinner 2013 
The dinner was addressed by both Professor Stanley Fischer and Lord King of Lothbury, respectively Governors of the Bank of Israel and the Bank of England shortly before their retirements as Governors.  The following companies and individuals were recognised with awards at the dinner:
 British Company of the Year: Grovepoint Capital
 Israeli Company of the Year: Ness Technologies
 Lifetime Achievement Award: Isaac Kaye

It also awarded Bunzl and Arad Water Technology as 2011 British-Israeli companies of the year.

Briefings 
UK Israel Business regularly hosts briefings for members and past speakers have included Chemi Peres, Dov Moran, Uri Levine (Waze), Carolyn McCall, Richard Solomons, Gavin Patterson, Ross McEwan, Sir Win Bischoff, Kimbal Musk, Ann Cairns, Xavier Rolet, Jon Medved (OurCrowd), Eugene Kandel, Lord Livingstone of Parkhead, Mark Regev, Daniel Taub, Avi Hasson, Matthew Gould, Michael O'Leary, Willie Walsh, Silvan Shalom, Yosef Abramowitz, Lord Fink, Lloyd Dorfman, the Rt Hon David Willetts MP, Tidjane Thiam, Governor Mervyn King, Sir Victor Blank, Vincent Tchenguiz, Sir Trevor Chinn, Lord Young of Graffham, Sammy Ofer, Shai Agassi, .

Summits 
Summits organised by UK Israel Business have been held in both London and Tel Aviv and focus on specific opportunities between the two countries.  Previous summits have included:
 Israel Private Equity Opportunity Summit – March 2014 – focussing on Private Equity Opportunities for British Investors in Israel brought about by the anti-concentration law of 2013.  Sponsored by Linklaters, Herzog Fox & Ne'eman and KPMG, speakers at the Summit included: Dan Gillerman and Sir Ronald Cohen and representatives of Apax Partners and the BVCA.  The summit received coverage in industry publications including unquote, The Wall Street Journal and  
 Israel Investor Summit – February 2015 – provided UK institutional investors with a deeper knowledge of the Israeli economy and a chance to hear from some Israeli companies who listed on the London Stock Exchange in 2014.  The event commenced with a market opening ceremony and the Summit was addressed by speakers including Xavier Rolet and Leo Leiderman. 
 Brexit Summit Tel Aviv – March 2017 – gathered over 100 Israelis in Tel Aviv to discuss the opportunities and challenges presented by Brexit
 Innovate Israel – September 2017 – featured 17 Israeli scale-up companies, and 150 UK corporates and investors

See also
Israel–United Kingdom relations

References

External links
Official website

Foreign trade of the United Kingdom
Foreign trade of Israel
Israel–United Kingdom relations
1950 establishments in the United Kingdom
Organizations established in 1950